Li Wei (born May 5, 1975) is a Chinese football coach and former international player who played as a goalkeeper.

As a player he represented Foshan Fosti, Xiamen Lanshi before moving to Guangzhou Pharmaceutical and Anhui Jiufang. Since retiring he would move into goalkeeping coaching where he is now the goalkeeping coach at the Shanghai Shenxin of Chinese Super League.

Football career
Li Wei began his football career with second tier football club Foshan Fosti who was taken over by Xiamen Lanshi in the 1998 league season. At Xiamen he would go on to establish himself as the team's first choice goalkeeper and aid the team to win promotion to the top tier as well as the division title in 1999. His impressive performances was considered good enough to be called up to the Chinese national team in 2000 by the Head coach Bora Milutinović who gave him his debut appearance on March 25, 2000 against Yugoslavia in a 2-0 defeat, this was to be his only international cap 
. By the end of the season Xiamen were relegated, despite this Li Wei remained as team's first-choice goalkeeper for the next several seasons and aided the team to another second tier title in 2002 before leaving in 2005 for Guangzhou Sunray Cave in exchange for Han Feng. He spent two seasons with them where he was unable to achieve promotion before ending his career with Anhui Jiufang.

Coach career
When the 2008 league season ended Li Wei announced his retirement from football, he decided to stay with Anhui Jiufang to become their goalkeeping coach.

He was appointed as the goalkeeping coach of China women's national team on 29 August 2010.

He became the goalkeeping coach of Chinese Super League side Shanghai Shenxin in January 2015.

Honours
As a player

Xiamen Lanshi
 Chinese Jia B League: 1999, 2002

References

External links
 Player stats at sodasoccer.com

1975 births
Living people
Sportspeople from Xi'an
Chinese footballers
Footballers from Shaanxi
China international footballers
Xiamen Blue Lions players
Guangzhou F.C. players
Anhui Jiufang players
Chinese Super League players
China League One players
Foshan Fosti F.C. players
Association football goalkeepers
Shanghai Shenxin F.C. non-playing staff
Association football goalkeeping coaches